Philip David Jones (born 30 September 1977) is an English former rugby league and rugby union footballer who played as a goal-kicking  or /fly-half. He played for Lancashire Lynx, Wigan Warriors and Leigh Centurions in rugby league, and Orrell, Rotherham Titans and Sedgley Park in rugby union.

Career
Jones started his senior career at Lancashire Lynx after being signed from amateur club Hindley. He moved to Super League side Wigan Warriors in 1999 for a transfer fee believed to be around £35,000. He spent three seasons at the club before switching to rugby union in 2001. In May 2002 Clive Woodward called up Jones to the England squad for the non-cap test against the Barbarians.

He returned to rugby league for one season to play for Leigh Centurions in 2005.

References

External links
 Profile at Rugby League Project
 Profile at Statbunker

1977 births
Living people
Chorley Lynx players
English rugby league players
English rugby union players
Leigh Leopards players
Orrell R.U.F.C. players
Rotherham Titans players
Rugby league centres
Rugby league five-eighths
Rugby league players from Wigan
Rugby union players from Wigan
Sedgley Park R.U.F.C. players
Wigan Warriors players